Woicki (feminine: Woicka; plural: Woiccy) is a Polish surname. Notable people with the surname include:

 Iwona Woicka-Żuławska (born 1972), Polish diplomat
 Paweł Woicki (born 1983), Polish volleyball player

See also
 

Polish-language surnames